The Sunraysia Institute of TAFE, also known as SuniTAFE is a provider of vocational education and training services in north-west Victoria, Australia. Founded in 1980, its first campus is located in Mildura, Victoria, with additional campuses in Swan Hill, Robinvale, and Horsham, and a training farm in Cardross

History 
The institute was established in 1980 as the Sunraysia College of TAFE. The institute was the first purpose designed TAFE college in Victoria. It was renamed the Sunraysia Institute of TAFE on 2 October 1995.

From its inception the Institute aimed to provide training to meet the needs of the local community including the more remote locations in the region such as Ouyen, Manangatang and Werrimull. This was called the Outreach program. The institute was also established with a tri-state focus due to its unique location near the border of the three states of Victoria, New South Wales and South Australia.

Campuses 
The institute has four main campuses located at Mildura, Swan Hill, Robinvale and Horsham.

Service provision extends over a geographic area generally bounded by Pooncarie in NSW (150 km to the North); Balranald in NSW (200 km to the east); the Riverland region in SA (150 km to the west); Murrayville in Victoria (230 km to the south west on the SA border); and in a region 375 km south and south east of Mildura including the communities of Ouyen, Robinvale, Sea Lake, Swan Hill, Ultima and Kerang.

Courses 
Study areas offered by the Institute in its first years of operation included Automotive Studies, Business Studies, Engineering, and Rural Studies. Today the institute offers training in areas of Automotive, Transport & OHS, Health and Wellbeing, Business & Environment, Education and Media, Hospitality & Personal Services, Industry & Energy & Environment and Language, Literacy & Work Skills

Some modules include providing services at the nearby Australian Inland Botanic Gardens.

References

External links
 Sunraysia Institute of TAFE

Australian tertiary institutions
Australian vocational education and training providers
Educational institutions established in 1980
Mildura
1980 establishments in Australia